Artishia Garcia Gilbert (1868–1904) (also known as Artishia Gilbert-Wilkerson) was an African-American from Kentucky who became probably the first black woman licensed to practice medicine in the state. After obtaining her undergraduate and master's degrees in Kentucky, Gilbert earned her medical degree in Washington, D.C. While continuing her education, Gilbert taught at her alma mater and upon obtaining her license both continued to teach and practiced medicine in Louisville.

Early life
Artishia Garcia Gilbert was born on June 2, 1868 in Manchester, Clay County, Kentucky to Amanda (née Hopper) and William Gilbert. She was the younger of two children in the family. Her parents were farmers and until she was six years old, her father migrated to various communities, having no fixed residence. Each place that they lived, Gilbert made acquaintance with the local teachers, soon learning to spell and read. In 1878, her parents moved to Louisville and she entered the public schools, remaining for the next three years.

In 1881, Gilbert became a Christian and entered the Normal and Theological Institute run by Rev. William J. Simmons, (later known as State University). In 1885, she graduated from the Normal School and enrolled in university studies. During her schooling, Gilbert taught Sunday school and took in jobs to assist her mother with her tuition costs. She graduated with an A.B. degree in 1889 as class valedictorian.

Career
Upon completing her education, Gilbert began working as the editor of the magazine Our Women and Children, but when offered a teaching position in 1890 at her alma mater, she took the position as an English teacher and instructor of Greek grammar. A popular speaker on the Women's Baptist Educational Convention tours, Gilbert spoke at many organizations held throughout the South and served as a representative at the National Baptist Conventions. She was a matron at State University and served on the board of the Colored Orphan's Home, as well as president of several women's groups. She was associated with the Bell Embroidery Club, Ladies Union Band, Sons and Daughters of the Calvary, Sons and Daughters of the Morning, Women's Federation Board, Women's Industrial Club, and the Women's Improvement Club. Gilbert attended the short-lived, African-American run, Louisville National Medical College (1881–1911), earning her Artium Magiste degree in 1893. Thereafter, she received what was probably the first medical license issued to an African-American woman in the state of Kentucky, after passing her examination.

Gilbert opened her medical practice at 938 Dumesnil Street, Louisville and remained listed in national physician registries at this address through 1902. In 1896, Gilbert furthered her education at Howard University in Washington, D. C., receiving her Doctor of Medicine degree upon her graduation the following year. While in the capital, she met Bernard Orange "B. O." Wilkerson, whom she married on June 1, 1897 in New York City. Returning to Louisville, Gilbert worked as an assistant to the obstetrics professor of the Medical Department at State University and was the superintendent of the Red Cross Sanitarium of Louisville. She had three children: B. O. Jr., Artishia Garcia Jr., and a male infant who was two weeks old at the time of her death.

Death and legacy
Gilbert died two weeks after having given birth to her youngest child and was buried on April 2, 1904, in a service which was widely attended by family, friends, and business colleagues.

References

Citations

Bibliography

 

 
 

1868 births
1904 deaths
People from Manchester, Kentucky
19th-century American educators
19th-century American physicians
20th-century American physicians
African-American educators
Physicians from Kentucky
Simmons College of Kentucky alumni
Howard University alumni
Physicians from Louisville, Kentucky
Kentucky women in health professions
Kentucky women in education
20th-century American women physicians
19th-century American women physicians
19th-century American women educators
20th-century African-American women
20th-century African-American people
20th-century African-American physicians